Lisa Sigal (born 1962) is a contemporary artist who lives and works in Brooklyn, New York.

Life and work
Sigal was born in Philadelphia, Pennsylvania.

She works with painting, sculpture and architecture. Her constructions insinuate themselves into the fabric of the built environment. She will take a Sheetrock wall, cut into it, pull back sections, poke a sightline through to a false or a found wall on which she has exposed or composed a painted surface.

Sigal's solo and group exhibitions include: Factory Installed, Mattress Factory, Pittsburgh (2015) Prospect.3: Notes for Now, New Orleans (2014–15); Riverbed, LAX Art, Los Angeles (2013); Building, Dwelling, Thinking, NOMA Gallery, San Francisco (2010); Museum as Hub: Six Degrees, New Museum, New York (2008); The 2008 Whitney Biennial, New York; Tent Paintings, Frederieke Taylor Gallery, New York (2007); The Orpheus Selection, PS1 Contemporary Art Center, Long Island City (2007); Make It Now, SculptureCenter, Long Island City, (2005); and A House of Many Mansions, Aldrich Contemporary Art Museum, Ridgefield, Connecticut (2005).

Sigal is the co-founder and co-curator, with Nova Benway, of Open Sessions, a program for artists run by The Drawing Center.

References

External links
 Glenn Ligon on Lisa Sigal, published in ArtReview 30: 
 Review of solo exhibition at Frederieke Taylor Gallery, Artforum (2008): 
 Review: "Lisa Sigal at Frederieke Taylor and P.S.1," Art in America (2008): 
 Interview with Sigal on Creative Capital's blog on Riverbed: 
 Prospect New Orleans blog post about Sigal's work in development for Prospect.3: 

1962 births
Living people
American contemporary artists
Artists from Philadelphia